Homoeosoma miguelensis is a species of snout moth in the genus Homoeosoma. It was described by Meyer, Nuss and Speidel in 1997, and is known from the Azores.

References

Moths described in 1997
Phycitini
Endemic arthropods of the Azores